Neyyappam (Malayalam: നെയ്യപ്പം) is a sweet rice-based fritter fried in ghee. Neyyappam has its origins in the southern Indian state of Kerala and coastal Karnataka. The name is derived from the words neyy (നെയ്യ്) meaning "ghee" (clarified butter) and appam (അപ്പം) meaning "pancake".

Neyyappam is typically made of rice flour (alternatively, with semolina), jaggery, ghee-fried coconut (pieces or grated), ghee, cardamom and milk. 
It is served as a tea time snack usually in the evenings. Neyyappam is also served as offering in Hindu temples in Kerala. This practice has also been adopted by some sections of Christians in Kerala. Unni appam is a variant in which mashed ripe plantains or bananas are added to the batter and fried to result in a ball-like shape.

Neyyappam became a topic of discussion as its name was shown on the home page of the Android N naming campaign. The official video of Google about naming Android N also shows a glimpse of neyyappam and Kerala tourism made a tweet about this naming campaign.

Origins 
Neyyappam traces its origin to the southern Indian state of Kerala.

Preparation

Utensils 
In traditional Kerala cuisine, Neyyappam is cooked in a bronze pan called appakara (:ml:അപ്പക്കാര)  (also known as Paniyaram Pan in Tamil Nadu), about 8 inches in diameter, having three or more large cavities and thereby giving the dish a tortoise-like shape. Recipes vary from place to place, especially the ingredients chosen to prepare the batter.

Many cuisines use variations on this pan for similar dishes. A substitute for an appakara is the special pan used to prepare Æbleskiver, the Danish puffy ball-like pancake dessert.

In the absence of these special utensils, neyyappam may be cooked on a griddle or a small cooking pan (skillet).

A typical method (directly using rice)  
 Rinse the white rice in water and keep it soaked for 3–4 hours.
 Skip this step if using rice flour or rava/semolina. 
 Drain the water and grind the rice (using a mixer-grinder) with ripe banana and jaggery to form a thick paste.
 Fry dry coconut slices (or grated coconut) in ghee until golden-brown.
 Add the ghee-fried coconut, cardamom seeds and cumin seeds. Also add a pinch of dry ginger powder and mix well. Keep the batter for 30 minutes. 
 Heat ghee or cooking oil in a bottom-deep pan and pour a ladle full of batter into the pan, and fry till it becomes a golden-brown color.
 Keep the fried Neyyappams aside to drain off the excess oil and let it cool down before savouring.

See also
 Appam
 Idiyappam
 Pesaha appam
 Unni Appam
 Kue cucur, similar Indonesian snack.

References

Snack foods
Indian desserts
Kerala cuisine